Morgan James (born November 24, 1981) is an American singer, songwriter, and actress. She has appeared in numerous Broadway shows, including Motown: The Musical, Godspell, and The Addams Family.

Her first studio album, Hunter, was released by Epic Records in November 2014. Her second studio album, Reckless Abandon, was released on April 7, 2017.

James is also well known for her numerous musical collaborations with the jazz collective Postmodern Jukebox.

Early life and education
James was born Morgan Grunerud in Boise, Idaho, the daughter of educators and actors Allen Grunerud and Shellie Harwood. The family moved frequently when James was a child, going from Pocatello, Idaho to Utah, Tennessee, and eventually Modesto, California where she spent her high school years. She has a younger brother, Nicholas, who is an avant-garde musician and comedian. James was inspired by her actor parents to enter the performing arts, and she joined a choir while in middle school. Her grandmother also bought her a karaoke machine and agreed to pay for singing lessons until James went to college.

James attended high school at Peter Johansen High School in Modesto and graduated in 1999. At the age of 17, James realized it was her dream to attend The Juilliard School in New York City, and after auditioning, she was eventually wait-listed and then rejected. However, after significant correspondence with the head of admissions, she convinced him to accept her as the class's seventh singer, one above the usual six. There, she studied opera, and eventually earned her Bachelor of Music in Voice in 2003. In college, James also took a master class headed by Broadway veteran Barbara Cook.

Career
After college, James initially struggled to find work and looked for jobs that enabled her to use both her operatic and classical training. James did not make her Broadway debut until 2010 in the musical production of The Addams Family, starring Nathan Lane and Bebe Neuwirth. In 2011, James appeared in Frank Wildhorn's Wonderland and the Broadway revival of Godspell. James sprained her ankle in a rehearsal for Godspell in October 2011 and was unable to perform during previews. She recuperated and, by November 2011, was performing in the musical at the Circle in the Square Theatre. In 2013, James took on the role of Teena Marie in Motown: The Musical. She stayed with the cast until December 2013, when she left to pursue a vocal performance tour.

While on Broadway she moonlighted as a solo artist, with a backing band often composed of Chris Fenwick, Matt Fieldes, Damien Bassman, among others. She has played at numerous New York City clubs, including (Le) Poisson Rouge, 54 Below, Rockwood Music Hall,  and Birdland. Her first solo album, Morgan James Live: A Celebration of Nina Simone, was recorded at New York jazz club, Dizzy's, and is a collection of Nina Simone cover songs. It was released via Epic Records in December 2012.

Her second solo album (and first studio album), Hunter, was recorded in 2014 and released via Epic Records in June 2014. The 11-track album was produced by Doug Wamble and is James' first album of all solo material. The album included her cover of Prince's song "Call My Name", which Prince allowed her to put on the record.

On December 16, 2016, James released her second cover album, Blue, released on the 45th anniversary of Joni Mitchell's album of the same name.

Reckless Abandon, her second solo studio album, was independently released on April 7, 2017, via her self-created Hedonist Records. It is her first album to feature completely original material and heavily incorporates elements of soul and R&B. On March 31, 2017, she embarked on a national headlining spring "Reckless Abandon Tour" in support of the album.

Since 2014, James collaborates with Postmodern Jukebox, producing several cover songs on their YouTube channel and joining them on tour.

In 2018, Morgan James released The White Album, her own interpretation of The Beatles' album, on the occasion of its 50th anniversary.

In 2020, James, alongside Broadway legends Cynthia Erivo, Orfeh, Shoshana Bean and Ledisi, was featured on the all-female EP, She is Risen, which covers songs from Andrew Lloyd Webber's Jesus Christ Superstar.

Personal life
James lives in Harlem with her husband, guitarist and producer Doug Wamble, whom she wed in spring of 2016.

Discography

Studio albums

Cover albums

Singles

References

External links
 
 

1981 births
American women singer-songwriters
American women jazz singers
American jazz singers
American musical theatre actresses
Actresses from Modesto, California
Epic Records artists
Juilliard School alumni
Living people
21st-century American women
Singer-songwriters from Idaho